The 2021–22 Washington Wizards season was the 61st season of the franchise in the National Basketball Association (NBA) and 48th in the Washington, D.C. area. After a first-round exit from last year, Scott Brooks agreed to part ways with the Wizards on June 16, 2021. Wes Unseld Jr. would be hired as the next head coach on July 17, 2021.

The Wizards were eliminated from postseason contention on March 31 after an Atlanta Hawks win over the Cleveland Cavaliers.

Draft picks

Entering the draft, the Wizards only had Pick #15 as their natural selection, which they used to draft Corey Kispert. However, before the draft, the Wizards pulled off a blockbuster trade that sent Russell Westbrook and two future second-round picks to the Los Angeles Lakers for multiple players and the rights to the Lakers 2021 first round pick (which became Isaiah Jackson) at #22. Later that night, the Wizards traded the draft rights to Jackson to the Indiana Pacers for Aaron Holiday and the rights to Pick #31 (Isaiah Todd).

Roster

Standings

Division

Conference

Game log

Preseason

|-style="background:#fcc;"
| 1
| October 5
| @ Houston
| 
| Bradley Beal (18)
| Montrezl Harrell (11)
| Spencer Dinwiddie (5)
| Toyota Center11,495
| 0–1
|-style="background:#fcc;"
| 2
| October 9
| New York
| 
| Montrezl Harrell (18)
| Montrezl Harrell (10)
| Beal, Dinwiddie (4)
| Capital One Arena8,060
| 0–2
|-style="background:#fcc;"
| 3
| October 12
| Toronto
| 
| Kyle Kuzma (24)
| Daniel Gafford (17)
| Spencer Dinwiddie (7)
| Capital One Arena7,048
| 0–3
|-style="background:#fcc;"
| 4
| October 15
| @ New York
| 
| Spencer Dinwiddie (17)
| Daniel Gafford (10)
| Kyle Kuzma (5)
| Madison Square Garden12,258
| 0–4

Regular season

|-style="background:#cfc;"
| 1
| October 20
| @ Toronto
| 
| Bradley Beal (23)
| Kyle Kuzma (15)
| Spencer Dinwiddie (6)
| Scotiabank Arena19,800
| 1–0
|-style="background:#cfc;"
| 2
| October 22
| Indiana
| 
| Spencer Dinwiddie (34)
| Kyle Kuzma (11)
| Spencer Dinwiddie (9)
| Capital One Arena15,407
| 2–0
|-style="background:#fcc;"
| 3
| October 25
| @ Brooklyn
| 
| Bradley Beal (19)
| Kyle Kuzma (13)
| Spencer Dinwiddle (6)
| Barclays Center14,487
| 2–1
|-style="background:#cfc;"
| 4
| October 27
| @ Boston
|  
| Montrezl Harrell (25)
| Montrezl Harrell (11)
| Dinwiddie, Holiday (3)
| TD Garden19,156
| 3–1
|-style="background:#cfc;"
| 5
| October 28
| Atlanta
| 
| Bradley Beal (27)
| Montrezl Harrell (13)
| Harrell, Neto (5)
| Capital One Arena13,653
| 4–1
|-style="background:#cfc;"
| 6
| October 30
| Boston
| 
| Bradley Beal (36)
| Kyle Kuzma (17)
| Bradley Beal (6)
| Capital One Arena15,813
| 5–1

|-style="background:#fcc;"
| 7
| November 1
| @ Atlanta
| 
| Bradley Beal (24)
| Kyle Kuzma (6)
| Spencer Dinwiddie (10)
| State Farm Arena14,632
| 5–2
|-style="background:#fcc;"
| 8
| November 3
| Toronto
| 
| Bradley Beal (25)
| Montrezl Harrell (10)
| Bradley Beal (7)
| Capital One Arena13,538
| 5–3
|-style="background:#cfc;"
| 9
| November 5
| Memphis
| 
| Bradley Beal (17)
| Montrezl Harrell (8)
| Bradley Beal (7)
| Capital One Arena16,302
| 6–3
|-style="background:#cfc;"
| 10
| November 7
| Milwaukee
| 
| Bradley Beal (30)
| Kyle Kuzma (10)
| Bradley Beal (8)
| Capital One Arena15,570
| 7–3
|-style="background:#cfc;"
| 11
| November 10
| @ Cleveland
| 
| Montrezl Harrell (24)
| Montrezl Harrell (11)
| Bradley Beal (7)
| Rocket Mortgage FieldHouse18,056
| 8–3
|-style="background:#cfc;"
| 12
| November 13
| @ Orlando
| 
| Spencer Dinwiddie (23)
| Spencer Dinwiddie (11)
| Spencer Dinwiddie (6)
| Amway Center17,272
| 9–3
|-style="background:#cfc;"
| 13
| November 15
| New Orleans 
| 
| Spencer Dinwiddie (27)
| Deni Avdija (10)
| Spencer Dinwiddie (9)
| Capital One Arena13,914
| 10–3
|-style="background:#fcc;"
| 14
| November 17
| @ Charlotte
| 
| Bradley Beal (24)
| Deni Avdija (11)
| Bradley Beal (7)
| Spectrum Center14,402
| 10–4
|-style="background:#fcc;"
| 15
| November 18
| @ Miami
| 
| Bradley Beal (30)
| Kyle Kuzma (13)
| Kyle Kuzma (7)
| FTX Arena19,600
| 10–5
|-style="background:#cfc;"
| 16
| November 20
| Miami
| 
| Bradley Beal (21)
| Kyle Kuzma (11)
| Bradley Beal (9)
| Capital One Arena20,476
| 11–5
|-style="background:#fcc;"
| 17
| November 22
| Charlotte
| 
| Montrezl Harrell (24)
| Montrezl Harrell (18)
| Bradley Beal (9)
| Capital One Arena16,575
| 11–6
|-style="background:#fcc;"
| 18
| November 24
| @ New Orleans
| 
| Bradley Beal (23)
| Montrezl Harrell (9)
| Spencer Dinwiddie (9)
| Smoothie King Center14,659
| 11–7
|-style="background:#cfc;"
| 19
| November 26
| @ Oklahoma City
|  
| Beal, Caldwell-Pope (20)
| Kyle Kuzma (10)
| Bradley Beal (6)
| Paycom Center14,579
| 12–7
|-style="background:#cfc;"
| 20
| November 27
| @ Dallas
| 
| Bradley Beal (26)
| Daniel Gafford (10)
| Bradley Beal (7)
| American Airlines Center20,223
| 13–7
|-style="background:#fcc;"
| 21
| November 29
| @ San Antonio
| 
| Bradley Beal (18)
| Daniel Gafford (10)
| Bradley Beal (8)
| AT&T Center12,606
| 13–8

|-style="background:#cfc;"
| 22
| December 1
| Minnesota
| 
| Montrezl Harrell (27)
| Daniel Gafford (10)
| Spencer Dinwiddie (11)
| Capital One Arena15,318
| 14–8
|-style="background:#fcc;"
| 23
| December 3
| Cleveland
| 
| Deni Avdija (16)
| Montrezl Harrell (8)
| Dinwiddie, Holiday, Neto (4)
| Capital One Arena17,227
| 14–9
|-style="background:#fcc;"
| 24
| December 5
| @ Toronto
| 
| Kentavious Caldwell-Pope (26)
| Montrezl Harrell (14)
| Bradley Beal (7)
| Scotiabank Arena19,800
| 14–10
|-style="background:#fcc;"
| 25
| December 6
| @ Indiana
| 
| Bradley Beal (34)
| Daniel Gafford (8)
| Holiday, Neto (5)
| Gainbridge Fieldhouse12,581
| 14–11
|-style="background:#cfc;"
| 26
| December 8
| @ Detroit
| 
| Kyle Kuzma (26)
| Daniel Gafford (10)
| Spencer Dinwiddie (7)
| Little Caesars Arena10,499
| 15–11
|-style="background:#fcc;"
| 27
| December 11
| Utah
| 
| Bradley Beal (21)
| Daniel Gafford (11)
| Bradley Beal (5)
| Capital One Arena17,575
| 15–12
|-style="background:#fcc;"
| 28
| December 13
| @ Denver
| 
| Davis Bertans (21)
| Montrezl Harrell (7)
| Bradley Beal (10)
| Ball Arena14,632
| 15–13
|-style="background:#fcc;"
| 29
| December 15
| @ Sacramento
| 
| Bradley Beal (30)
| Kentavious Caldwell-Pope (7)
| Bradley Beal (5)
| Golden 1 Center13,806
| 15–14
|-style="background:#fcc;"
| 30
| December 16
| @ Phoenix
| 
| Bradley Beal (26)
| Montrezl Harrell (7)
| Bradley Beal (5)
| Footprint Center16,177
| 15–15
|-style="background:#cfc;"
| 31
| December 18
| @ Utah
| 
| Bradley Beal (37)
| Daniel Gafford (9)
| Bradley Beal (7)
| Vivint Arena  18,306
| 16–15
|-style="background:lightgrey;"
| -
| December 21
| @ Brooklyn
|colspan=6| Postponed (COVID-19) (Makeup date: February 17)
|-style="background:#cfc;"
| 32
| December 23
| @ New York
| 
| Spencer Dinwiddie (21)
| Kyle Kuzma (10)
| Spencer Dinwiddie (12)
| Madison Square Garden18,208
| 17–15
|-style="background:#fcc;"
| 33
| December 26
| Philadelphia
| 
| Spencer Dinwiddie (17)
| Kyle Kuzma (10)
| Spencer Dinwiddie (6)
| Capital One Arena16,767
| 17–16
|-style="background:#fcc;"
| 34
| December 28
| @ Miami
| 
| Spencer Dinwiddie (24)
| Daniel Gafford (11)
| Spencer Dinwiddie (11)
| FTX Arena19,600
| 17–17
|-style="background:#cfc;"
| 35
| December 30
| Cleveland
| 
| Bradley Beal (29)
| Kyle Kuzma (10)
| Bradley Beal (10)
| Capital One Arena15,637
| 18–17

|-style="background:#fcc;"
| 36
| January 1
| Chicago
| 
| Kyle Kuzma (29)
| Kyle Kuzma (12)
| Bradley Beal (17)
| Capital One Arena19,043
| 18–18
|-style="background:#cfc;"
| 37
| January 3
| Charlotte
| 
| Kyle Kuzma (36)
| Kyle Kuzma (14)
| Avdija, Beal (8)
| Capital One Arena8,902
| 19–18
|-style="background:#fcc;"
| 38
| January 5
| Houston
| 
| Bradley Beal (27)
| Kyle Kuzma (9)
|  Bradley Beal (5)
| Capital One Arena13,014
| 19–19
|-style="background:#fcc;"
| 39
| January 7
| @ Chicago
| 
| Bradley Beal (26)
| Kyle Kuzma (11)
| Bradley Beal (6)
| United Center21,700
| 19–20
|-style="background:#cfc;"
| 40
| January 9
| @ Orlando
| 
| Kyle Kuzma (27)
| Kyle Kuzma (22)
| Spencer Dinwiddie (10)
| Amway Center13,223
| 20–20
|-style="background:#cfc;"
| 41
| January 11
| Oklahoma City
| 
| Kyle Kuzma (29)
| Gafford, Harrell (7)
| Spencer Dinwiddie (10)
| Capital One Arena13,985
| 21–20
|-style="background:#cfc;"
| 42
| January 12
| Orlando
| 
| Kyle Kuzma (19)
| Caldwell-Pope, Kuzma (10)
| Kyle Kuzma (9)
| Capital One Arena13,138
| 22–20
|-style="background:#fcc;"
| 43
| January 15
| Portland
| 
| Spencer Dinwiddie (27)
| Kyle Kuzma (12)
| Spencer Dinwiddie (7)
| Capital One Arena15,124
| 22–21
|-style="background:#cfc;"
| 44
| January 17
| Philadelphia
|  
| Montrezl Harrell (18)
| Kyle Kuzma (16)
| Spencer Dinwiddie (7)
| Capital One Arena14,581
| 23–21
|-style="background:#fcc;"
| 45
| January 19
| Brooklyn
| 
| Bradley Beal (23) 
| Harrell, Kuzma (6)
| Bradley Beal (9)
| Capital One Arena15,380
| 23–22
|-style="background:#fcc;"
| 46
| January 21
| Toronto
| 
| Bradley Beal (25)  
| Rui Hachimura (8)
| Bradley Beal (8) 
| Capital One Arena14,755
| 23–23
|-style="background:#fcc;"
| 47
| January 23
| Boston
| 
| Bradley Beal (19)
| Avdija, Beal, Hachimura (7)
| Bradley Beal (7)
| Capital One Arena16,371
| 23–24
|-style="background:#fcc;"
| 48
| January 25
| L.A. Clippers
| 
| Bradley Beal (23)
| Kyle Kuzma (12)
| Bradley Beal (6)
| Capital One Arena13,544
| 23–25
|-style="background:#fcc;"
| 49
| January 29
| @ Memphis
| 
| Kyle Kuzma (30)
| Kyle Kuzma (8)
| Bradley Beal (12)
| FedEx Forum17,135
| 23–26

|-style="background:#fcc;"
| 50
| February 1
| @ Milwaukee
| 
| Kyle Kuzma (25) 
| Kyle Kuzma (11)
| Spencer Dinwiddie (9)
| Fiserv Forum17,341
| 23–27
|-style="background:#cfc;"
| 51
| February 2
| @ Philadelphia
| 
| Kyle Kuzma (24) 
| Spencer Dinwiddie (12)
| Spencer Dinwiddie (10)
| Wells Fargo Center20,089
| 24–27
|-style="background:#fcc;"
| 52
| February 5
| Phoenix
| 
| Montrezl Harrell (15)
| Montrezl Harrell (7)
| Dinwiddie, Holiday (3)
| Capital One Arena18,058
| 24–28
|-style="background:#fcc;"
| 53
| February 7
| Miami
| 
| Corey Kispert (20)
| Avdija, Kispert (6)
| Spencer Dinwiddie (6)
| Capital One Arena14,222
| 24–29
|-style="background:#cfc;"
| 54
| February 10
| Brooklyn
| 
| Raul Neto (21)
| Kyle Kuzma (13) 
| Kyle Kuzma (10)
| Capital One Arena14,222
| 25–29
|-style="background:#fcc;"
| 55
| February 12
| Sacramento
| 
| Kyle Kuzma (22) 
| Kyle Kuzma (8) 
| Kyle Kuzma (7) 
| Capital One Arena14,169
| 25–30
|-style="background:#cfc;"
| 56
| February 14
| Detroit
| 
| Kyle Kuzma (23)
| Ish Smith (6)
| Deni Avdija (15)
| Capital One Arena10,793
| 26–30
|-style="background:#fcc;"
| 57
| February 16
| @ Indiana
| 
| Kentavious Caldwell-Pope (27)
| Kyle Kuzma (15)
| Raul Neto (8)
| Gainbridge Fieldhouse14,540
| 26–31
|-style="background:#cfc;"
| 58
| February 17
| @ Brooklyn
| 
| Rui Hachimura (20)
| Deni Avdija (8) 
| Ish Smith (6)
| Barclays Center17,447
| 27–31
|-style="background:#fcc;"
| 59
| February 25
| San Antonio
| 
| Kyle Kuzma (36)
| Deni Avdija (9) 
| Raul Neto (9)
| Capital One Arena15,302
| 27–32
|-style="background:#fcc;"
| 60
| February 26
| @ Cleveland
| 
| Kyle Kuzma (34)
| Kyle Kuzma (13)
| Raul Neto (6)
| Rocket Mortgage FieldHouse19,432
| 27–33

|-style="background:#cfc;"
| 61
| March 1
| Detroit
| 
| Kyle Kuzma (21) 
| Kyle Kuzma (9) 
| Ish Smith (8)
| Capital One Arena12,122
| 28–33
|-style="background:#fcc;"
| 62
| March 4
| Atlanta
| 
| Kentavious Caldwell-Pope (28)
| Hachimura, Bryant (6)
| Kyle Kuzma (11) 
| Capital One Arena15,927
| 28–34
|-style="background:#cfc
| 63
| March 6
| Indiana
| 
| Kristaps Porziņģis (25)
| Ish Smith (7)
| Ish Smith (9)
| Capital One Arena13,937
| 29–34
|-style="background:#fcc;"
| 64
| March 9
| @ L.A. Clippers
|  
| Kristaps Porziņģis (19)
| Daniel Gafford (10)
| Ish Smith (8)
| Crypto.com Arena15,282
| 29–35
|-style="background:#fcc;"
| 65
| March 11
| @ L.A. Lakers
| 
| Kyle Kuzma (23)
| Kristaps Porziņģis (14)
| Neto, Satoranský (4)
| Crypto.com Arena18,997
| 29–36
|-style="background:#fcc;"
| 66
| March 12
| @ Portland
| 
| Kentavious Caldwell-Pope (26)
| Corey Kispert (5)
| Caldwell-Pope, Neto, Smith (5)
| Moda Center17,524
| 29–37
|-style="background:#fcc;"
| 67
| March 14
| @ Golden State
| 
| Kristaps Porziņģis (25)
| Kristaps Porziņģis (8)
| Raul Neto (7)
| Chase Center18,064
|29–38
|-style="background:#fcc;"
| 68
| March 16
| Denver
| 
| Deni Avdija (19)
| Kyle Kuzma (9)
| Kyle Kuzma (7)
| Capital One Arena15,326
| 29–39
|-style="background:#fcc;"
| 69
| March 18
| @ New York
| 
| Kuzma, Porziņģis (18)
| Kristaps Porziņģis (11) 
| Kyle Kuzma (9) 
| Madison Square Garden19,812
| 29–40
|-style="background:#cfc;"
| 70
| March 19
| L.A. Lakers
| 
| Kristaps Porziņģis (27) 
| Caldwell-Pope (10)
| Tomáš Satoranský (6)
| Capital One Arena20,476
| 30–40
|-style="background:#fcc;"
| 71
| March 21
| @ Houston
| 
| Kristaps Porziņģis (22) 
| Kristaps Porziņģis (13) 
| Raul Neto (10)
| Toyota Center13,396
| 30–41
|-style="background:#fcc;"
| 72
| March 24
| @ Milwaukee
| 
| Ish Smith (17)
| Kristaps Porziņģis (9)
| Neto, Smith (6)
| Fiserv Forum18,018
| 30–42
|-style="background:#cfc;"
| 73
| March 25
| @ Detroit
| 
| Kristaps Porziņģis (30)
| Deni Avdija (10)
| Tomáš Satoranský (6)
| Little Caesars Arena18,943
| 31–42
|-style="background:#cfc;"
| 74
| March 27
| Golden State
| 
| Corey Kispert (25)
| Kristaps Porziņģis (9) 
| Tomáš Satoranský (7)
| Capital One Arena24,760
| 32–42
|-style="background:#fcc;"
| 75
| March 29
| Chicago
| 
| Rui Hachimura (21)
| Kristaps Porziņģis (10) 
| Tomáš Satoranský (10)
| Capital One Arena15,922
| 32–43
|-style="background:#cfc;"
| 76
| March 30
| Orlando
|  
| Kristaps Porziņģis (35) 
| Tomáš Satoranský (10)
| Tomáš Satoranský (13)
| Capital One Arena16,455
| 33–43

|-style="background:#cfc;"
| 77
| April 1
| Dallas
| 
| Kentavious Caldwell-Pope (35)
| Kristaps Porziņģis (9)
| Ish Smith (9)
| Capital One Arena17.745
| 34–43
|-style="background:#fcc;"
| 78
| April 3
| @ Boston
| 
| Caldwell-Pope, Porziņģis (17)
| Hachimura, Porziņģis (7)
| Tomáš Satoranský (7)
| TD Garden19,156
| 34–44
|-style="background:#cfc;"
| 79
| April 5
| @ Minnesota
| 
| Kristaps Porziņģis (25)
| Daniel Gafford (12)
| Ish Smith (14)
| Target Center17,136
| 35–44
|-style="background:#fcc;"
| 80
| April 6
| @ Atlanta
| 
| Kristaps Porziņģis (26)
| Kristaps Porziņģis (18)
| Avdija, Smith (6) 
| State Farm Arena17,381
| 35–45
|-style="background:#fcc;"
| 81
| April 8
| New York
| 
| Rui Hachimura (21)
| Thomas Bryant (10)
| Tomáš Satoranský (8)
| Capital One Arena19,472
| 35–46
|-style="background:#fcc;"
| 82
| April 10
| @ Charlotte
|  
| Rui Hachimura (21)
| Anthony Gill (8)
| Tomáš Satoranský (9)
| Spectrum Center18,465
| 35–47

Transactions

Trades

Free Agents

Re-signed

Additions

Subtractions

Notes

References

Washington Wizards seasons
Washington Wizards
Washington Wizards
Washington Wizards